Acheron is a river in the Epirus region of Greece, believed in ancient Greek mythology to branch into the underworld.

Acheron may also refer to:

Places
Acheron, Victoria, a town in Australia
Acheron (Elis), a river in the Peloponnese, Greece
 Acheron Island, an island off Queensland, Australia
Acheron River (Victoria), Australia
Acheron River (Marlborough), New Zealand
Acheron River (Canterbury), New Zealand

Fiction
Acheron (Dungeons & Dragons), one of the Outer Planes in Dungeons and Dragons cosmology
Acheron Hades, a diabolical villain in Jasper Fforde's book The Eyre Affair
A main character of the webcomic Inverloch
The Acheron, a fictional 19th-century French warship in the motion picture Master and Commander: The Far Side of the World
Acheron LV-426, the planet where the film Alien, and its sequel are primarily set
Acheron Parthenopaeus, a character in the Dark-Hunter series of romance books
"Acheron: Part 1" and "Acheron: Part 2", a two-part episode from the television series The Walking Dead

Other uses
Acheron (band), a Florida death metal band
HMS Acheron, the name of several ships of the Royal Navy
Acheron-class torpedo boat, a torpedo boat of the New South Wales Naval Brigade
, a French Navy submarine commissioned in 1932 and scuttled in 1942
Acheron language, a language of Sudan
 The earlier name for Abramelin, a Melbourne death metal band
 "Acheron/Unearthing the Orb", a song by the Sword from the album Warp Riders

See also
Charon, ferryman of Hades in Greek mythology
Hades, Greek god of the dead
Styx, river between the world and the underworld in Greek mythology
The Grim Reaper, a personification of death